Jane Elizabeth Harley, Countess of Oxford and Countess Mortimer (née Scott; 1774–1824) was an English noblewoman, known as a patron of the Reform movement and a lover of Lord Byron.

Life
She was a daughter of the Reverend James Scott, M.A., Vicar of Itchen Stoke in Hampshire and was brought up in favour of French Revolutionary thought and Reform. In 1794 she married Edward Harley, 5th Earl of Oxford and Earl Mortimer (with her father taking the service), being styled Countess of Oxford and Countess Mortimer. She was a friend of the Princess of Wales. She frequently took lovers from among the pro-Reform party during her marriage, firstly Francis Burdett and most notably Lord Byron (the affair lasting from 1812, in the aftermath of Byron's affair with Lady Caroline Lamb, when he was fourteen years her junior, until 1813, when she and her husband went abroad but Byron did not follow as she had hoped). Her marriage was not a love match and her large number of children were known as the "Harleian Miscellany" due to uncertainties over whether her husband was their father, but the marriage did not break up. Even in the easy-going world of the Regency aristocracy, her affairs were considered to have put her beyond the pale, and few people were prepared to receive her or call on her. Ironically, given their shared interest in Byron, Caroline Lamb was one of her few friends, although Caroline could not resist caricaturing her in her novel Glenarvon.

Children

Among her children were:
Edward Harley, Lord Harley (20 January 1800 – 1 January 1828).
Alfred Harley, 6th Earl of Oxford and Earl Mortimer.
Lady Jane Elizabeth Harley; married Henry Bickersteth, raised to the peerage as Baron Langdale.
Lady Charlotte Mary Harley (b. 1801 or 1809, d 1880); in 1823 married Anthony Bacon.
Lady Anne Harley; married Signor Giovanni Battista Rabitti Count St. George.
Lady Frances Harley; married Lt.-Col. Henry Vernon Harcourt, Esq., the son of the Archbishop of York.

References

Sources
Byron's letters and journals, page 286
http://www.blupete.com/Literature/Biographies/Literary/Byron.htm

1774 births
1824 deaths
18th-century English people
18th-century English women
19th-century English women
Oxford and Earl Mortimer
Lord Byron
Jane
People from the City of Winchester
Women of the Regency era